The Chicago mayoral election of 1881 was held on April 5, saw incumbent Mayor Carter Harrison Senior defeat Republican Candidate John Clark, winning a majority of the vote and a nearly twelve point margin of victory.

The election took place on April 5.

Unlike in the previous mayoral election, the Socialist Labor Party's nominee did not have much of an impact.

Results

References

Mayoral elections in Chicago
Chicago
Chicago
1880s in Chicago